RC-33 or Bahour-Soriankuppam Road starts from Bahour and ends at Soriankuppam.

It is passing through the following villages:
 Kuruvinatham

References

External links
 Official website of Public Works Department, Puducherry UT

State highways in Puducherry
Transport in Puducherry